Checkmate is a 1935 Ariston Films Limited British crime film directed by George Pearson at Boreham Wood Studios and starring Maurice Evans, Felix Aylmer and Evelyn Foster. It was based on a novel by Amy Kennedy Gould. A Scotland Yard detective hunts down jewel thieves in London, but becomes involved with the daughter of the gang's boss.

Cast
 Maurice Evans as Phillip Allen
 Felix Aylmer as Henry Nicholls
 Evelyn Foster as Mary Nicholls
 Sally Gray as Jean Nicholls
 Donald Wolfit as Jack Barton
 Wilfrid Caithness as Inspector Smith
 Percy Walsh as Mr. Curtail
 Ernest Jay as Huntly
 John Buckmaster as Mike Doyle

References

External links
 

1935 films
Films directed by George Pearson
1935 crime films
Films produced by Anthony Havelock-Allan
British crime films
Quota quickies
Films set in London
1930s English-language films
British black-and-white films
British and Dominions Studios films
Films shot at Imperial Studios, Elstree
1930s British films